In enzymology, a 4-galactosyl-N-acetylglucosaminide 3-alpha-L-fucosyltransferase is an enzyme that catalyzes the chemical reaction

GDP-beta-L-fucose + 1,4-beta-D-galactosyl-N-acetyl-D-glucosaminyl-R  GDP + 1,4-beta-D-galactosyl-(alpha-1,3-L-fucosyl)-N-acetyl-D-glucosaminyl- R

Thus, the two substrates of this enzyme are GDP-beta-L-fucose and 1,4-beta-D-galactosyl-N-acetyl-D-glucosaminyl-R. Its 3 products are GDP, 1,4-beta-D-galactosyl-(alpha-1,3-L-fucosyl)-N-acetyl-D-glucosaminyl-, and R.

This enzyme belongs to the family of glycosyltransferases, specifically the hexosyltransferases.  The systematic name of this enzyme class is GDP-beta-L-fucose:1,4-beta-D-galactosyl-N-acetyl-D-glucosaminyl-R 3-alpha-L-fucosyltransferase. Other names in common use include:
Lewis-negative alpha-3-fucosyltransferase
plasma alpha-3-fucosyltransferase
guanosine diphosphofucose-glucoside alpha1→3-fucosyltransferase
galactoside 3-fucosyltransferase
GDP-L-fucose:1,4-beta-D-galactosyl-N-acetyl-D-glucosaminyl-R
3-L-fucosyltransferase
GDP-beta-L-fucose:1,4-beta-D-galactosyl-N-acetyl-D-glucosaminyl-R, and
3-L-fucosyltransferase

This enzyme participates in 3 metabolic pathways: glycosphingolipid biosynthesis - neo-lactoseries, glycosphingolipid biosynthesis - globoseries, and glycan structures - biosynthesis 2.

Structural studies 

References

 
 
 

EC 2.4.1
Enzymes of known structure